The International Critics' Week was founded in 1962 and is organized by the French Syndicate of Cinema Critics. It was created following the showing of The Connection directed by Shirley Clarke which had been organized by the French Syndicate of Cinema Critics for the 1961 Cannes Film Festival.

It is the oldest parallel non-competitive section of the Cannes Film Festival. It showcases first and second feature films by directors from all over the world, and has remained true to its tradition of discovering new talents. Bernardo Bertolucci, Philip Kaufman, Ken Loach, Tony Scott, Agnieszka Holland, Leos Carax, Wong Kar-wai, Guillermo del Toro, Jacques Audiard, Arnaud Desplechin, Gaspar Noé, François Ozon, Andrea Arnold, Alejandro González Iñárritu, Julia Ducournau, all started out at Critics’ Week.

The International Critics’ Week presents a very selective programming of only seven feature films and seven short films in Cannes so that the films can get a greater visibility. The Critics’ Week Grand Prix (Nespresso Prize) is awarded by the press (journalists and films critics are invited to vote after each screening of the Selection). Feature films also run for the SACD Prize for best screenplay and the ACID Prize that helps the film to be distributed. In 2012, the France 4 Visionary Award (Prix Revelation) was introduced to reflect "the cinephile's passion for young talent" in the film industry. Short films can receive the Canal+ Award for best short film and the Kodak Discovery Award. The first feature films also run for the Caméra d'Or.

Notable jury presidents have included Cristian Mungiu, Joachim Trier, Valérie Donzelli, Ciro Guerra and Kleber Mendonça Filho.

Awards
Feature Films
The Nespresso Grand Prize   
France 4 Visionary Award
SACD Prize
Short Films
Discovery Award
Canal+ Award

References

External links

International Critics' Week Official Website

Cannes Film Festival